Robert Ivan Lucas (born 7 June 1953) is a former Australian politician and a former member of the South Australian Legislative Council between the 1982 election and the 2022 election, representing the South Australian Division of the Liberal Party of Australia. Lucas served as the Treasurer of South Australia between 2018 and 2022 in the Marshall government, and previously served in the role between 1997 and 2002 in the Olsen and Kerin governments. Lucas was the Father of the Parliament until his retirement at the 2022 election.

Career

Before his entry into politics, Lucas graduated from the University of Adelaide with a Bachelor of Science, a Bachelor of Economics, and a MBA.

In office, Lucas has been a Minister for Education and Children's Services, Minister for Industry and Trade and Minister for Government Enterprises. He also served as Treasurer from the 1997 election until his party's defeat at the 2002 election. During this time (1993 to 2002), he was the Leader of the Government in the Legislative Council. The appointment of Lucas, a member of the upper house Legislative Council, as Treasurer was a break in convention as previous Treasurers had been members of the lower house the House of Assembly. The precedence in appointing a member of the upper house as Treasurer was in New South Wales with the appointment of Michael Egan in 1995.

From 2002 until April 2007, Lucas served as Shadow Treasurer, Shadow Minister for Industry and Trade and Police, and between 2005 and 2006 was also Shadow Minister for Economic Development and Science and Information Economy. During this time (2002 to 2007), Lucas was the Leader of the Opposition in the Legislative Council.

In 2014 Lucas returned to the Treasury portfolio albeit as Shadow Treasurer following the retirement of the previous portfolio holder and former Liberal leader Iain Evans. He became treasurer and Leader of the Government in the Legislative Council again on 19 March 2018 following his party winning government at the 2018 election.

Two days after the election, he announced on 19 March 2018 that he would be serving his final term in parliament, with an intention to leave parliament at the 2022 election.

Personal life 
Lucas's mother Yoshiko was a "war bride" who met his father, Bob, who was part of the British Commonwealth Occupation Force in Japan.

References

External links
 
 Personal website
 

|-

|-

|-

|-

|-

|-

|-

Australian people of Japanese descent
Politicians of Japanese descent
Members of the South Australian Legislative Council
Liberal Party of Australia members of the Parliament of South Australia
1953 births
Living people
Treasurers of South Australia
21st-century Australian politicians
University of Adelaide alumni